The Magic Treehouse is the debut album from Ooberman, released in October 1999 on Independiente Records. The album was produced by Stephen Street, famous for his work with The Smiths and Blur, among others.

Four singles were released from the album - "Blossoms Falling", "Million Suns", "Tears From A Willow" and "Shorley Wall". An earlier version of "Shorley Wall" had previous been the lead track of an EP released by the band on Tugboat Records. A demo recording of Sugar Bum was released as a single on Graham Coxon's Transcopic label in May 1998. This was the band's first official release.

Track listing
 "Million Suns" (Dan Popplewell, Andy Flett) – 4:16
 "Blossoms Falling" (Dan Popplewell, Andy Flett) – 2:31
 "Sur La Plage" (Dan Popplewell) – 3:14
 "Roro Blue" (Dan Popplewell) – 2:14
 "Tears from a Willow" (Dan Popplewell) – 3:32
 "Bees" (Dan Popplewell, Andy Flett) – 1:57
 "Sugar Bum" (Dan Popplewell) – 3:17
 "Roll Me in Cotton" (Dan Popplewell) – 4:00
 "Physics Disco" (Dan Popplewell, Andy Flett) – 2:48
 "The Magic Treehouse" (Dan Popplewell) – 1:34
 "Amazing in Bed" (Dan Popplewell) – 3:17
 "My Baby's Too Tall and Thin" (Sophia Churney) – 0:42
 "Shorley Wall" (Dan Popplewell, Andy Flett) – 4:28
 "Silver Planet" (Dan Popplewell, Andy Flett) – 12:59

A hidden track - "Stormtrooper" - is placed at the end of Silver Planet after a period of silence.

External links 
 The Magic Treehouse – Ooberman fansite

1999 albums
Albums produced by Stephen Street
Ooberman albums